Hartmut Hoffmann (born 13 February 1943) is a German football player active in the DDR-Oberliga, active until 13 June 1973. He played for Motor/Sachsenring Zwickau and is notable as a member of their 1967 team which won the FDGB-Pokal that year.

Bibliography

  Hanns Leske, Enzyklopädie des DDR-Fußballs. Die Werkstatt, Göttingen 2007, 
  Baingo/Horn, Geschichte der DDR-Oberliga. Göttingen 2007, 
  Uwe Nuttelmann, DDR-Oberliga. Eigenverlag 2007,

External links

East German footballers
1943 births
Living people
German footballers needing infoboxes
Association football forwards